Boserup is a Danish surname. Notable people with the surname include:

Anders Boserup (1940–1990), Danish researcher
Ester Boserup (1910–1999), Danish economist
Julia Boserup (born 1991), American tennis player 

Danish-language surnames